Spintharus skelly is a species of comb-footed spider in the family Theridiidae. It is found in the Dominican Republic. It is one of 15 new species described in 2018.

References

Theridiidae
Spiders described in 2018
Spiders of the Caribbean